The West Branch of the Mohawk River is a  river in northern New Hampshire in the United States. It is a tributary of the Mohawk River, which flows west to the Connecticut River, which in turn flows south to Long Island Sound, an arm of the Atlantic Ocean.

The West Branch rises in Stewartstown, New Hampshire, between Mudget Mountain to the north and Lovering Mountain to the south. The river flows south and is joined by the East Branch at the village of Upper Kidderville in the town of Colebrook. The West Branch continues south and joins the Mohawk River in Kidderville, just north of New Hampshire Route 26.

See also 

 List of New Hampshire rivers

References

Rivers of New Hampshire
Tributaries of the Connecticut River
Rivers of Coös County, New Hampshire